Villa of Herodes Atticus is an ancient Roman villa located on the outskirts of the community of Doliana in Arcadia, Greece.

It was built in the 2nd century AD, in the area where the ancient city of Eva was located. It was first discovered in 1809 by the English traveler William Martin Leake and in the early 20th century it was identified by archaeologist and professor Konstantinos Romaios, as the mansion of the famous politician and sophist Herodes Atticus.

The Loukous' monastery is located near the villa. Astros is also a few kilometers away.

Gallery

See also

 Archaeological Museum of Astros
 Loukou Monastery

References

Ancient Roman buildings and structures in Greece
Archaeological sites in the Peloponnese (region)
Arcadia, Peloponnese
Buildings and structures completed in the 2nd century